The Petite rivière Smith (English: Little Smith River) is a tributary of the northwest shore of the Smith River. This stream flows in the unorganized territory of Lac-Jacques-Cartier, in the La Côte-de-Beaupré Regional County Municipality, in the administrative region of Capitale-Nationale, in the province of Quebec, in Canada.

This small forest valley is served by a forest that goes from south to north by the east bank. Forestry is the main economic activity in this valley; second, recreational tourism.

Because of its altitude, the surface of "Petite rivière Smith" is generally frozen from late November to early April; however, safe circulation on the ice is generally done from mid-December to the end of March. The water level of the river varies with the seasons and the precipitation; the spring flood occurs in March or April.

Geography 
The "Petite rivière Smith" rises at the confluence of two forest streams in the forest area. This source is located between two mountains in the unorganized territory of Lac-Jacques-Cartier, at:
  north of a mountain peak;
  south of another mountain peak;
  north-east of the confluence of the Smith River and Montmorency River;
  north of the mouth of the Montmorency River.

  south-west in a deep valley, crossing a small wild lake, to its mouth;
  first towards the southwest and curving towards the south, to its mouth.

Toponymy 
The toponym "Petite rivière Smith" is linked to its main stream, the "Smith River".

The toponym "Petite rivière Smith" was formalized on November 1, 1988 at the Commission de toponymie du Québec.

Notes and references

Appendices

See also 
 La Côte-de-Beaupré Regional County Municipality
 Lac-Jacques-Cartier, a TNO
 Smith River, a stream
 Montmorency River
 List of rivers of Quebec

Bibliography 
 

Rivers of Capitale-Nationale
La Côte-de-Beaupré Regional County Municipality